
Phaq'u Quta (Aymara phaq'u, paqu, p'aqu light brown, reddish, blond, dark chestnut, quta lake, "chestnut coloured lake") is a lake in Bolivia located in the La Paz Department, Pedro Domingo Murillo Province, El Alto Municipality. It is situated at a height of about 4,667 metres (15,312 ft) south of the mountain Chacaltaya, south-east of Milluni Lake and south-west of Qillwani (Khelluani).

Gallery

See also 
 Janq'u Quta (El Alto)
 Laram Quta

References 

Lakes of La Paz Department (Bolivia)